The Free Will is a 2006 German drama film directed by Matthias Glasner. It premiered in competition at the 56th Berlin International Film Festival in February 2006 and was awarded two prizes: Jürgen Vogel received a Silver Bear for Outstanding Artistic Contribution and director Matthias Glasner received the Prize of the Guild of German Art House Cinemas. The film was also shown at various film festivals throughout 2006 and 2007, and Jürgen Vogel received Best Actor awards at Chicago International Film Festival and Tribeca Film Festival.

Plot

The frustrated kitchen helper Theo Stoer raped a young cyclist on the Baltic coast. He was arrested a few hours later. Because of this crime and two other rapes, the court sent him to a closed psychiatric institution for censorship. After nine years, Theo comes to a supervised shared apartment in Mülheim an der Ruhr on probation.

Probation officer Sascha gives Theo a job in a print shop. In order to let off steam, Theo does strength training and a martial arts; he satisfies his sexual needs through masturbation. In everyday life, Theo finds it difficult on the one hand to control himself and to approach people. He is interested in a waitress at the Pizzeria Trattoria Funghi, but does not dare to speak to her. When Sascha encourages him, he manages to overcome his anxiety. However, she refuses the offer to go out with him.

One day Theo meets Nettie, the distraught daughter of the widowed print shop owner. Despite initial difficulties in getting closer together, the first tender bonds develop. Before a real relationship can develop, however, Nettie begins an internship in a Belgian praline factory. Since the probation officer has been released and moved to Berlin, Theo is left alone. One evening he is about to rape a saleswoman who was serving him in a department store just before closing time. He secretly follows her over the subway to her apartment. But he can pull himself together and leaves the apartment unnoticed.

Theo then visits Nettie unannounced in Belgium. When he can't find his own hotel room on a rainy evening, Nettie takes him to her room, where he secretly lies down with her at night. In the morning there is first contact. After her work Theo picks up Nettie and goes with her to a church, where he has prepared a surprise for her: the organ plays and a soprano sings the song "Ave Maria", which was on the radio the night before.

Theo and Nettie get together, but quickly realize that they are both tormented souls. While Theo has to deal with his desire for women, Nettie has been fighting against the psychological attacks of her own father for years. When Nettie returns to Mülheim, Theo moves in with her.

Back in Germany, Theo realizes that he will never be able to suppress his urges. When Nettie goes out with other people one evening and transfers him, he wanders the streets and rapes another woman.

When they return, Theo tells his girlfriend about his past and breaks up. He also admits that he relapsed the day before. She fled to her father. When she returned to the apartment the next day, the furniture was smashed and Theo disappeared.

Nettie seeks out a woman who was raped by Theo nine years ago. First, the woman assumes that Nettie is also a rape victim and goes with her to a café. Nettie confesses, however, that she is not a victim, but Theo is a friend and that she has the woman's address from a journalist. The woman follows Nettie to the toilet, hits her, forcibly pulls her pants down and abuses her.

Nettie suspects that Theo has disappeared to Sascha in Berlin. She manages to find the two. She secretly pursues Theo and observes that he is interested in a young woman who is going home alone and is persecuting her. She loses them both in the bustle of a fair.

Theo disappears at the train station the next morning, Nettie follows him on the train to the sea. When he was sitting in a hotel bar, she had the receptionist give her the room key “as a friend” and discovered that he had already laid razor blades ready for a suicide attempt in the full bathtub. She leaves the hotel in shock. When she later takes the initiative and returns to the room, the water is drained and the blades are gone.

She finds him on the beach at night and can't prevent him from slitting his wrists there in her presence. Resigned, she lets it happen and takes him in her arms, where he gradually bleeds to death.

Cast
 Jürgen Vogel as Theo Stoer
 Sabine Timoteo as Netti Engelbrecht
 André Hennicke as Sascha
 Manfred Zapatka as Claus Engelbrecht
 Judith Engel as Anja Schattschneider
 Anna Brass as raped woman in the dunes 
 Maya Bothe as Sybille
 Frank Wickermann as Michael 
 Marcel Batangtaris as Toni

References

External links
 

2006 films
2006 drama films
German drama films
2000s German-language films
Silver Bear for outstanding artistic contribution
2000s German films